Richilda (born c. 895) was Countess of Barcelona, Girona and Ausona from at least 917 to her husband's retirement in 947. She appears in record as married to Sunyer, Count of Barcelona for the first time in 917 but may have been sooner. She is speculated to have been a daughter of the Count of Rouergue, possibly Raymond II, Count of Toulouse, based on the introduction of novel names into the family. They had four sons and a daughter: Ermengol, Miró, Borrell, Adelaide (also called Bonafilla), and Wifred.

References

10th-century people from the County of Barcelona
890s births

Year of birth uncertain

Year of death unknown